Sorola is a surname. Notable people with the surname include:

Gus Sorola (born 1978), American actor and podcast host
Manuel Sorola (1880–1957), American intelligence agent